Michael Bermingham is an Irish sportsperson. He played hurling for the Kilmacud Crokes club from 1951 until 1983 and was a member of the Dublin senior inter-county team.

Bermingham was selected on the Rest of Ireland Team in 1965. This was like the fore-runner to the All Stars, a team sponsored by the now defunct “Gaelic Weekly”. In 1971 he was selected at right-corner-forward in the first ever All Stars team, Dublin’s first All Star, having finished the season as one of the top scorers. In 1984 he was named on the Centenary Team of players who had not won All-Ireland honours.

Early years
Bermingham was born in Ireland began playing in his youth.

Playing career

Club
Bermingham won ten club championships, seven of which while playing in New York between 1965 and 1974. He won two Dublin Senior Hurling Championships in 1974 and 1976 and an Intermediate Championship in 1982.

Bermingham played his first game for Kilmacud Crokes in 1951 and, with a few interruptions, continued to play for the club until 1983, when business pressures put him off the panel. As a juvenile, Bermingham played in a number of games, including in the first ever Under 13 Juvenile Championships (beaten in the Irish Press Shield final). During the early 1950s, he played Scoil Uí Chonaill in the Under 15 Final. He also played on the Under 16½ team that won the championship in 1955.

There was a temporary split in the club in the early 1960s, which resulted in the formation of Dalcassians. A number of younger Crokes players left to join the new club and even won a Minor Championship, captained by Bermingham, in 1960. Differences had been resolved by 1962 and in 1963, with forces joined afresh, a team (boasting a substantial majority of Crokes players) representing the Junior Hurling Board won the Senior Championship and the Intermediate Championship was also won by Crokes that year.

One of the biggest influences on Bermingham was John Howard. John Howard, was a Garda stationed at Pearse St in central Dubln, was also one of the reasons Bermingham did not opt to play for Faughs, despite the fact that his father Ned was a committed Faughs supporter and his cousin Mick Gill was a star of the team in the 1930s and 1940s. Faughs did not have a juvenile team and, as the young Crokes stars developed and bonded under the guidance of John Howard, there was every incentive to stay put.

Bermingham continues to be involved in Crokes and was part of the Senior Team Management until 2005.

Inter-county
In 1961, Dublin beat Wexford 7-5 to 4-8 in the Leinster Final and went on to play Tipperary in the All-Ireland Final where they were narrowly beaten 0-16 to 1-12. However, due to injury, Bermingham did not get to play in either game.

Inter-provincial
Bermingham won six Railway Cup medals with Leinster, these include a double (1964–65) and a four in a row (1971–74).

Honours

Dalcassians
Dublin Minor Hurling Championship
Winner (1): 1960 (Capt.)

Galway
New York Senior Hurling Championship
Winner (5): 1964, 1965, 1966, 1970, 1973

Kilmacud Crokes

Dublin Senior Hurling Championship
Winner (2): 1974, 1976
Dublin Intermediate Hurling Championship
Winner (1): 1982

Dublin

All-Ireland Senior Hurling Championship
Runner-up (1): 1961
Leinster Senior Hurling Championship
Winner (1): 1961

Leinster

Railway Cup
Winner (6): 1964, 1965, 1971, 1972, 1973, 1974

Individual

Hurling Team of the Century (Non-All-Ireland Winners)
Winner (1): 1984
GAA All-Star
Winner (1): 1971
 Rest of Ireland Team
Winner (1): 1965

References

External links
Official Kilmacud Crokes Hurling Website
Biographical Information
Official Dublin Website
Dublin Website

Teams

Year of birth missing (living people)
Living people
Dublin inter-county hurlers
Kilmacud Crokes hurlers